Alpha-N-acetylgalactosaminide alpha-2,6-sialyltransferase 2 is an enzyme that in humans is encoded by the ST6GALNAC2 gene.

References

Further reading